Cannabis in Burkina Faso is illegal.

What is cannabis? 
Cannabis is a drug that comes from Indian hemp plants such as Cannabis sativa and Cannabis indica. The main active chemical in cannabis is THC (delta-9 tetrahydrocannabinol). Cannabis is a plant that people use  for recreational and medicinal purposes. Cannabis-based products come from the dried flowering tops, leaves, stems, and seeds of the Cannabis sativa (hemp) plant. It can have a pleasurable effect and may soothe the symptoms of various conditions, such as chronic pain.  The legal status of medical and recreational cannabis varies among states. In Burkina Faso Cannabis (or Marijuana) is illegal for recreational and illegal for medical use.

Production
Between 2009 and 2011, cannabis seizures in Burkina Faso doubled. From 2000 to 2005 Burkina Faso has had a total of 11,411cannabis herb seizures.  Cannabis resin is considered the second most trafficked drug in the world.

References

Burkina Faso
Drugs in Burkina Faso